is a Japanese television drama. It is broadcast and produced by Fuji Television. Drama started with a 22.4% (Kanto Region) rating on January 14, 2008.

Plot
Eiji Shiomi is a florist. He is a single man with a young daughter named Shizuku. One day, he invited a blind woman seeking shelter under his shop awning to come in his shop. A surprising tale gradually unfolds with their budding love, revealing a complex web of lies and dark motives. Nothing is as it seems at first, and each of the characters is burdened with their own painful secrets, but finally resolved with love and kindness.

Episode 1
Flashes of scenes in the past in a hospital. A man, Eiji, running to the emergency room, shocked by what he found out. A clutched rose fell from his hand to the ground. Eiji's wife died while delivering the baby, Shizuku...

At the flower shop, a soaking woman, Mio, is standing under the shelter, sheltering from the rain. Eiji invited her in to get warm, then noticed her appearing to be blind. In order to thank Eiji, Mio insisted in buying something; she demanded a rose, which is the kind of flower not sold in Eiji's shop.

Eiji's daughter Shizuku has been wearing a mask all day long recently. Shizuku's teacher informed Eiji to school and told him that Shizuku was bullied by a kid in the class earlier, and she concerned of Shizuku's wearing the mask. Though Shizuku is popular in the class, they worried about if something had happened to her. Eiji then went visiting her grandma living at the hill, knowing that it is because of that the thoughtful Shizuku didn't want Eiji to suffer from the pain by remember her mother, his passing wife, from seeing Shizuku's resembling face on her coming birthday, which happened to be the date of his wife's death...

Near by the dock, thinking Shizuku might be blaming herself for her mother's death, Eiji told her a different version of the tale "North wind and the sun," that though the sun loves the stranger, it cannot come too close to the stranger or it will hurt him with the flame; that's why the sun decided to look after the stranger from a distance. Shizuku knew that Eiji implies that her passing mother's looking after her in the heaven; she cried and said that Eiji had never scold at her, that he is also like the sun but he is not hurting her at all. They hugged...

Cast

Main cast
 Shingo Katori as Shiomi Eiji
 Yūko Takeuchi as Mio Shirato
 Yumiko Shaku as Yuki Ono
 Shota Matsuda as Naoya Kudo
 Susumu Terajima as Kengo Shijo
 Junko Ikeuchi as Keiko Hishida
 Tomokazu Miura as Teruo Anzai
 Yuika Motokariya as Shizuku's mother
 Yuki Yagi as Shiomi Shizuku
 Yuki Imai as Shogo Hirota
 Tamayama Tetsuji as Kamiyama Shun

Episodes

Theme Song
Zutto Issho sa (Together Forever) by Tatsuro Yamashita

External links
 Official Site
 

2008 Japanese television series debuts
2008 Japanese television series endings
Japanese drama television series
Fuji TV dramas
Television shows written by Shinji Nojima